McCullin is a 2012 feature-length documentary film, directed by David Morris and Jacqui Morris, about the life and work of photojournalist Don McCullin.

The film premiered at the 2012 Hot Docs Canadian International Documentary Festival.

McCullin was nominated for Outstanding Debut by a British Writer, Director or Producer and Best Documentary at the 66th British Academy Film Awards. It also won the award for Best Use of Footage in a Cinema Release at the 2014 Focal International Awards.

It has a 100% approval rating based on 18 reviews, and an average rating of 7.3/10, at Rotten Tomatoes, with consensus not yet reached.

References

External links 

2012 films
2012 documentary films
2010s English-language films
Documentary films about war photographers